George Kateb is William Nelson Cromwell Professor of Politics, Emeritus, at Princeton University. A staunch individualist, he has written scholarly works on Ralph Waldo Emerson, John Stuart Mill, and Hannah Arendt and on the ethical dimensions of the individual in a constitutional democracy. More recently he has turned his attention to what he sees as the increasing erosion of individual liberty wrought by the Bush administration and the poisonous influence of religious, ethnic and statist group identity on morality.

Kateb earned his A.B., A.M. and Ph.D. at Columbia University and was a Junior Fellow at Harvard University. He then taught at Amherst College for thirty years before joining the faculty at Princeton in 1987. As a member of the executive committee of the University Center for Human Values he was involved with the search committee that somewhat controversially appointed the noted Australian philosopher Peter Singer to a chair in bioethics at Princeton in 1999. Kateb is a member of the American Academy of Arts and Sciences. He has also served as vice president of the American Society of Political and Legal Philosophy and president of the New England Political Science Association. He has also served as a member of the editorial board or consulting editor of the Journal of the History of Ideas, the Library of America, Alternative Futures, the American Political Science Review, Political Theory, and Raritan Quarterly Review. He is a recipient of the Behrman Award for Distinguished Achievement in the Humanities from Princeton. He retired from teaching in 2002.

Bibliography
 Utopia and Its Enemies (1963)
 Political Theory: Its Nature and Uses (1968)
 Hannah Arendt: Politics, Conscience, Evil (1984)
 The Inner Ocean: Individualism and Democratic Culture (1992)
 Emerson and Self-Reliance (1994)
 Patriotism and Other Mistakes (2006)
 Human Dignity (2011)

References

External links
 Princeton Report On Knowledge Forum with Kateb
 Kateb's contributions to the New York Review of Books
 Kateb's Princeton faculty page

1931 births
Living people
Amherst College faculty
American male non-fiction writers
American political philosophers
American political writers
Columbia University alumni
Harvard Fellows
Princeton University faculty